Alexandru Berlescu (born 22 July 1894, date of death unknown) was a Romanian bobsledder. He competed in the four-man event at the 1928 Winter Olympics.

References

1894 births
Year of death missing
Romanian male bobsledders
Olympic bobsledders of Romania
Bobsledders at the 1928 Winter Olympics
Place of birth missing